The 1st Army was a field army of the Czechoslovak People's Army, active from 1958-65 and 1969–1991. In its second formation its headquarters was in Pribram.

In the 1980s the force included the 1st Tank Division (:cs:1. tanková divize (Československo)), 2nd Motor Rifle Division, 19th Motor Rifle Division, and 20th Motor Rifle Division, as well as many smaller units, including the 321st Army Missile Brigade. 

The 1st Army was disbanded on 1 December 1991.

Role of the Prague Spring 
By the early 1960s, Czechoslovak president and Communist Party head, Antonin Novotny, grew concerned that the military opposed increasing involvement in the Warsaw Pact. Accordingly, he moved to reorganize the CPA and reassign several generals. In 1965, Novotny reorganized the 1st Army into the Western Military District, and the commander of the 1st Army, Lt. Gen Stanislav Prochazka, saw his power significantly reduced. Nonetheless, he initially earned the favor of the new president, Ludvík Svoboda, in 1968. When the Prague Spring uprising occurred under Alexander Dubcek, Svoboda initially sympathized with the protests. Prochazka then publicly expressed sympathy for the uprising as well. Additionally, Prochazka publicly expressed his opposition to Warsaw Pact intervention in Czechoslovakia's internal affairs. When Svoboda decided to support Warsaw Pact intervention and Soviet suzerainty over Czechoslovakia, General Prochazka was forced into early retirement and the 1st Army reformed again under General Karel Rusov.

Units of the Army 1989  
This listing is based on the Czech Ministerstvo národní obrany 1950-1990 website, which lists all units of the Czechoslovak People's Army in existence between 1950 and 1990, with their location, subordination, equipment and changes over time.

The Army's 1st Headquarters Battalion was located in Příbram.

 1st Tank Division in Slaný (in case of full mobilization would have also formed the 16th Tank Division)
 1st Tank Regiment in Strašice
 2nd Tank Regiment in Rakovník
 21st Tank Regiment in Žatec
 3rd Motor Rifle Regiment in Louny with BVP-1 tracked infantry fighting vehicles
 1st Artillery Regiment in Terezín
 1st Separate Rocket Launcher Division in Terezín with OTR-21 Tochka tactical ballistic missiles
 13th Separate Rocket Launcher Division in Čihadla with 9K52 Luna-M artillery rocket systems
 1st Command and Artillery Reconnaissance Battery in Slaný
 5th Anti-Aircraft Missile Regiment in Žatec with 9K33 Osa surface-to-air missile systems
 1st Reconnaissance Battalion in Podbořany
 3rd Engineer Battalion in Terezín
 2nd Signal Battalion in Slaný
 1st Supply Battalion in Bílina
 1st Maintenance Battalion in Žatec
 5th Chemical Defence Battalion in Slaný
 5th Medical Battalion in Terezín

 2nd Motor Rifle Division  in Sušice
 23rd Tank Regiment in Holýšov
 10th Motor Rifle Regiment in Janovice nad Úhlavou with BVP-1 tracked infantry fighting vehicles
 11th Motor Rifle Regiment in Klatovy with OT-64 wheeled armored transports vehicles
 12th Motor Rifle Regiment in Domažlice with OT-64 wheeled armored transports vehicles
 8th Artillery Regiment in Klatovy
 2nd Separate Rocket Launcher Division in Holýšov with 9K52 Luna-M artillery rocket systems
 2nd Command and Artillery Reconnaissance Battery in Sušice
 2nd Anti-Aircraft Missile Regiment in Janovice nad Úhlavou with 2K12 Kub surface-to-air missile systems
 2nd Reconnaissance Battalion in Janovice nad Úhlavou
 4th Engineer Battalion in Střelské Hoštice
 4th Signal Battalion in Sušice
 2nd Supply Battalion Klatovy
 2nd Maintenance Battalion in Klatovy
 2nd Chemical Defence Battalion in Kdyně
 2nd Medical Battalion

 19th Motor Rifle Division in Plzeň
 11th Tank Regiment in Plzeň
 57th Motor Rifle Regiment in Stříbro with BVP-1 tracked infantry fighting vehicles
 67th Motor Rifle Regiment in Bor with OT-64 wheeled armored transports vehicles
 104th Motor Rifle Regiment in Tachov with OT-64 wheeled armored transports vehicles
 47th Artillery Regiment in Plzeň
 19th Separate Rocket Launcher Division in Bor with 9K52 Luna-M artillery rocket systems
 19th Command and Artillery Reconnaissance Battery in Plzeň
 11th Anti-Aircraft Missile Regiment in Stříbro with 2K12 Kub surface-to-air missile systems
 19th Reconnaissance Battalion in Tachov
 11th Engineer Battalion in Plzeň
 11th Signal Battalion in Plzeň
 19th Supply Battalion in Příchovice
 19th Maintenance Battalion in Plzeň
 11th Chemical Defence Battalion in Plzeň
 11th Medical Battalion

 20th Motor Rifle Division in Karlovy Vary
 12th Tank Regiment in Podbořany
 49th Motor Rifle Regiment in Mariánské Lázně with BVP-1 tracked infantry fighting vehicles
 65th Motor Rifle Regiment in Cheb with OT-64 wheeled armored transports vehicles
 74th Motor Rifle Regiment in Karlovy Vary with OT-64 wheeled armored transports vehicles
 38th Artillery Regiment in Kynšperk nad Ohří
 20th Separate Rocket Launcher Division in Stružná with 9K52 Luna-M artillery rocket systems
 20th Command and Artillery Reconnaissance Battery in Karlovy Vary
 12th Anti-Aircraft Missile Regiment in Mariánské Lázně with 2K12 Kub surface-to-air missile systems
 20th Reconnaissance Battalion in Cheb
 12th Engineer Battalion in Kadaň
 12th Signal Battalion in Karlovy Vary
 20th Supply Battalion in Ostrov
 20th Maintenance Battalion in Podbořany
 12th Chemical Defence Battalion in Karlovy Vary
 12th Medical Battalion

 321st Heavy Artillery Brigade in Rokycany
 21st Heavy Artillery Division with SS-1C Scud-B tactical ballistic missiles
 22nd Heavy Artillery Division with SS-1C Scud-B tactical ballistic missiles
 21st Artillery Base in Kostelec nad Orlicí servicing the missiles of the 321st Heavy Artillery Brigade

 322nd Cannon Artillery Brigade in Dobřany
 Command and Artillery Reconnaissance Battery
 1st Cannon Artillery Division with 18x 130mm M1954 towed howitzers
 2nd Cannon Artillery Division with 18x 130mm M1954 towed howitzers
 3rd Cannon Artillery Division with 18x 152mm SpGH DANA self-propelled howitzers
 4th Cannon Artillery Division with 18x 152mm SpGH DANA self-propelled howitzers
 5th Cannon Artillery Division with 18x 152mm SpGH DANA self-propelled howitzers
 51st Engineer Brigade in Litoměřice
 Engineer Battalion
 Engineer Battalion
 Engineer Battalion
 51st Engineer Roadblocking Battalion
 51st Engineer Transit Battalion
 1st Supply Brigade in Terezín
 2nd Transport Battalion in Terezín
 3rd Transport Battalion in Terezín
 4th Transport Battalion in Terezín
 5th Transport Battalion in Terezín
 6th Fuel Transport Battalion in Rakovník
 175th Medical Evacuation Battalion in Nechranice
 171st Anti-aircraft Missile Regiment in Rožmitál pod Třemšínem with 20x 2K12 Kub surface-to-air missile systems
 Headquarters Battery
 1st Firing Battery
 2nd Firing Battery
 3rd Firing Battery
 4th Firing Battery
 5th Firing Battery
 Technical Battery
 216th Anti-tank Regiment in Most
 1st Anti-tank Division with 12x 100mm vz. 53 anti-tank cannons and 6x BRDM-2 vehicles in the anti-tank variant with Konkurs anti-tank missiles
 2nd Anti-tank Division with 12x 100mm vz. 53 anti-tank cannons and 6x BRDM-2 vehicles in the anti-tank variant with Konkurs anti-tank missiles
 3rd Anti-tank Division with 12x 100mm vz. 53 anti-tank cannons and 6x BRDM-2 vehicles in the anti-tank variant with Konkurs anti-tank missiles
 91st Pontoon Regiment in Litoměřice
 1st Signal Regiment in Plzeň-Bory
 1st Signal Battalion
 2nd Signal Battalion 
 3rd Signal Battalion
 11th Long Distance Signal Communications Regiment in Plzeň
 3rd Electronic Warfare Regiment in Mariánské Lázně
 71st Special Purpose Electronic Intelligence Regiment in Kladno
 71st Radio Surveying HF Company
 71st Radio Surveying VHF Company
 71st Radio Surveying and Targeting Company
 71st Automatic Radio Surveying and Targeting Company
 71st Combat Support and Services Company
 1st Reconnaissance Artillery Division in Holýšov
 1st Radio-technical Battalion in Holýšov
 Light Radio-technical Company
 Heavy Radio-technical Company
 Signal Company
 103rd Chemical Defence Battalion in Lešany
 11th Road Construction Battalion in Horažďovice
 1st Radiation Center in Příbram
 1st Command and Reconnaissance Squadron in Plzeň-Bory
 1st Helicopter Detachment with 2x Mi-2 helicopters to support the 1st Tank Division in wartime
 2nd Helicopter Detachment with 2x Mi-2 helicopters to support the 2nd Motor Rifle Division in wartime
 19th Helicopter Detachment with 2x Mi-2 helicopters to support the 19th Motor Rifle Division in wartime
 20th Helicopter Detachment with 2x Mi-2 helicopters to support the 20th Motor Rifle Division in wartime
 1st Air Base and Electronic Support Company
 101st Unmanned Aerial Vehicle Reconnaissance Squadron in Stříbro with Tupolev Tu-143 VR-3 Rejs drones
 11th Signal and Radio-technical Services Company in Příbram

References

External links
Michael Holm, 1st Army
https://forum.valka.cz/topic/view/73955

Field armies
Military units and formations of Czechoslovakia
Military units and formations disestablished in 1991